Chap Darreh (also known as Chāh Darreh and Chakh-Darrekh) is a village in Soltaniyeh Rural District, Soltaniyeh District, Abhar County, Zanjan Province, Iran. At the 2006 census, its population was 179, in 44 families.

References 

Populated places in Abhar County